Alessandro Rosa Vieira (born 8 June 1977), known as Falcão, is a Brazilian retired professional futsal player. He is known for his flashy and potent dribbling skills and a powerful and accurate left foot. He is also the world's all-time leading goalscorer in men's international matches. He was named as the Best Futsal Player in the World four times (2004, 2006, 2011 and 2012) and won the FIFA Futsal World Cup Golden Shoe in 2004 and the Golden Ball twice, in 2004 and 2008.
Today he is a YouTuber teaching futsal tricks and showing different things about futsal culture. His YouTube channel already has more than 1 million of subscribers

Career
Falcão joined the Guarapira futsal club in the northern zone of the city at the age of 13. He joined Corinthians in 1993 and became professional in 1993. He debuted in the senior team in 1994. In 1997, he joined GM-Chevrolet, owned by the General Motors company. After leaving in 1999, he switched teams frequently until 2003, when he ended up in Jaraguá. After changing clubs again from 2011 to 2012, he joined Sorocaba in 2013, where he played until 2018.

In 2004, 2006, 2011 and 2012, he was recognised as the Best Futsal Player in the World. On 26 June 2015, Falcão joined Nottingham Forest's futsal team for a tournament in Kuwait. He also played in the inaugural season of the Asian Premier Futsal Championship for Indian side Chennai 5s, scoring five goals in the tournament.

He also had a brief spell playing 11-a-side football with São Paulo Futebol Clube during the first half of 2005, including in the 2005 Copa Libertadores, but returned to futsal soon after.

Internationally, Falcão scored 401 goals in 258 appearances for the Brazil national futsal team. At the 2004 and 2008 FIFA Futsal World Cups, the latter on home soil, he was recognised by FIFA as the Best Player of the tournaments. In 2008 and 2012, he helped Brazil win their 4th and 5th title in the FIFA Futsal World Cup. On 22 September 2016, Falcão retired from the national team after they were eliminated by Iran in the round of 16 at the 2016 World Cup. Despite the early exit, he managed to score 10 goals, winning the Bronze Shoe and ultimately becoming the all-time top goalscorer in FIFA Futsal World Cup history, having scored 48 times. Falcão is considered by many football experts and players the greatest player in futsal history.

Besides being one of the greatest players in the sport's history, Falcão also participated on two of the most viewed futsal matches in history.

Honours

Club
South-American Championship: 2001, 2004
Liga Futsal: 1999, 2005, 2007, 2008, 2010, 2011, 2012, 2013, 2014
Brazilian Club Cup: 1998, 2003, 2004
São Paulo City Cup: 1995, 1998, 2002
Paulista Championship: 1995, 1997, 2000, 2001, 2014,2017
Mineiro Championship: 1999
Catarinense Championship: 2003
Metropolitan Championship: 1997, 1998, 1999, 2000, 2001
Topper São Paulo Cup: 1997, 2001
Copa Libertadores: 2005
Campeonato Paulista: 2005

National team
Futsal Mundialito: 2001
Nations Cup: 2001
RJ International Cup: 1998
American Cup: 1998, 1999, 2011
South American Qualification: 2000, 2008
Latin Cup: 2003
Tigers 5 Tournament – Singapore: 1999
Egypt Tournament: 2002
Thailand Tournament: 2003
Pan American Games: 2007
Grand Prix de Futsal: 2005, 2006, 2007, 2008, 2009, 2011, 2013, 2014, 2015, 2018
KL World 5s – Malaysia: 2008
FIFA Futsal World Cup: 2008, 2012
ODESUR Games: 2002, 2010

Individual
Best Futsal Player of the World: 2004, 2006, 2011, 2012
FIFA Futsal World Cup Golden Shoe: 2004
FIFA Futsal World Cup Golden Ball: 2004, 2008
FIFA Futsal World Cup Silver Shoe: 2008
FIFA Futsal World Cup Bronze Shoe: 2016
The FIFA Award for an Outstanding Career: 2016

References

External links

1977 births
Living people
Brazilian men's futsal players
Brazilian footballers
Futsal players at the 2007 Pan American Games
São Paulo FC players
ADC Intelli players
Pan American Games gold medalists for Brazil
Pan American Games medalists in futsal
Footballers from São Paulo (state)
Association football forwards
Medalists at the 2007 Pan American Games